The 1998 Texas Rangers season involved the Rangers finishing 1st in the American League west with a record of 88 wins and 74 losses.  It would be the team's second post-season appearance, but the team would be swept 3-0 by the New York Yankees.

Offseason
 November 6, 1997: Jim Leyritz and Damon Buford were traded by the Rangers to the Boston Red Sox for Mark Brandenburg, Bill Haselman, and Aaron Sele.
 November 20, 1997: Scott Sheldon was signed as a free agent by the Rangers.
December 7, 1997: Scott Bailes was signed as a free agent with the Texas Rangers.
 December 8, 1997: Kevin Elster was signed as a free agent with the Texas Rangers.
 December 9, 1997: Roberto Kelly was signed as a free agent by the Rangers.
 December 15, 1997: Scott Podsednik was drafted by the Rangers from the Florida Marlins in the 1997 rule 5 draft.
 December 23, 1997: Scott Cooper was signed as a free agent by the Rangers.
 March 14, 1998: Kevin Brown was traded by the Rangers to the Toronto Blue Jays for Tim Crabtree.

Regular season
During the season, Rick Helling would be the last pitcher to win at least 20 games in one season for the Rangers in the decade.

Season standings

Record vs. opponents

Notable transactions
 July 17, 1998: Todd Van Poppel and Warren Morris were traded by the Rangers to the Pittsburgh Pirates for Esteban Loaiza.
 July 31, 1998: Kevin Elster was released by the Texas Rangers.
 August 26, 1998: Greg Cadaret was selected off waivers by the Rangers from the Anaheim Angels.

Roster

Player stats

Batting

Starters by position
Note: Pos= Position; G = Games played; AB = At bats; R = Runs; H = Hits; HR = Home runs; RBI = Runs batted in; Avg. = Batting average; Slg. = Slugging Average; SB = Stolen bases

Other batters
Note: G = Games played; AB = At bats; H = Hits; Avg. = Batting average; HR = Home runs; RBI = Runs batted in

Pitching

Starting pitchers 
Note: G = Games pitched; IP = Innings pitched; W = Wins; L = Losses; ERA = Earned run average; SO = Strikeouts

Relief pitchers 
Note: G = Games pitched; W = Wins; L = Losses; SV = Saves; ERA = Earned run average; SO = Strikeouts

New York Yankees vs. Texas Rangers

Game 1
September 29 at Yankee Stadium (New York Yankees)

Game 2
September 30 at Yankee Stadium (New York Yankees)

Game 3
October 2 at The Ballpark in Arlington (Texas Rangers)

Awards and honors
Juan González, AL MVP
Juan González, Silver Slugger Award
Iván Rodríguez, C, Gold Glove
Iván Rodríguez, Silver Slugger Award
All-Star Game

Farm system

LEAGUE CHAMPIONS: Tulsa, GCL Rangers

References

1998 Texas Rangers team page at Baseball Reference
1998 Texas Rangers team page at www.baseball-almanac.com

Texas Rangers seasons
Texas Rangers season
American League West champion seasons
Range